Gendargenoy is a Chechen teip (clan). There is a hypothesis that it originated from the historic area in Chechen Republic called .

Notable people  
 Alu Alkhanov 
 Turpal Tokaev
 Ramzan Akhmadov
 Buvadi Dakhiyev
 Isa Gendergenoevsky
 Aiza Gazuyeva
 Zelimkhan Akhmadov
 Doku Zavgayev

References

 
Chechen people